Isn't It Time may refer to:

 "Isn't It Time" (The Babys song)
 "Isn't It Time" (The Beach Boys song)